Shavir (also Romanized as Shavīr, Shevīr, and Shūyer; also known as Shuyur) is a village in Sanjabad-e Gharbi Rural District, in the Central District of Kowsar County, Ardabil Province, Iran. At the 2006 census, its population was 140, in 22 families.

References 

Towns and villages in Kowsar County